Lie After Lie is a South Korean television series starring Lee Yu-ri and Yeon Jung-hoon. It aired on Channel A from September 4 to October 24, 2020, every Friday and Saturday at 22:50 (KST). The drama is also simulcast on Drama Cube, Dramax and Sky TV.

As of October 10, the drama has soared to a new all-time high in viewership. Going by Nielsen Korea, the latest episode of Lie After Lie scored average ratings of 5.8 percent nationwide and 6.3 percent in the Seoul metropolitan area, marking the drama’s highest ratings to date—and breaking its own record for the highest viewership ratings achieved by any drama in Channel A history. By the end of its run, the drama became one of the highest-rated Korean dramas in cable television history.

Synopsis
Ji Eun-soo is the daughter-in-law of a chaebol family who appears to have everything. Her life falls apart when she is accused of murdering her abusive husband and sentenced to ten years in prison. While in prison, she gave birth to a baby girl but is forced to give her up. She and her father reach out to Kang Ji-min, a journalist who suspected foul play behind Eun-soo's case and the only one willing to hear Eun-soo's side of the story. However, after a while, her letters to Ji-min are mysteriously returned while her father is later killed in a hit-and-run accident right before meeting Ji-min and Ji-min is sent on an overseas assignment just as he was getting closer to the truth. A determined Eun-soo tracks down her daughter upon her release and, in doing so, uncovers a complex web of lies and betrayal beginning with her former mother-in-law, CEO and respected businesswoman Kim Ho-ran.

Cast

Main
 Lee Yu-ri as Ji Eun-soo, a woman who has been recently released from prison. A decade ago, she had been imprisoned for allegedly murdering her abusive ex-husband while pregnant. Following her release, she embarks on a mission to find the baby she had given up for adoption back then.
 Yeon Jung-hoon as Kang Ji-min, a respected TV reporter who is popular with his colleagues and a devoted father. He has no qualms about using his position as a journalist to uncover corruption and fight for justice. At the time of Ji Eun-soo's release from prison, he had been investigating DO Cosmetics for some time despite being told to drop it by his supervisor.

Supporting
 Lee Il-hwa as Kim Ho-ran, Ji Eun-soo’s former mother-in-law. She is the CEO of DO Cosmetics who is known for her philanthropy and connections.
 Lim Ju-eun as Eun Se-mi, Kang Ji-min's ex-wife and a successful sports agent. She and Ji-min had adopted Woo-joo as an infant. They were initially a happy family until Ji-min's frequent traveling for work and a series of events led to the couple's bitter divorce. Ji-min received sole custody of Woo-joo and refused to grant Se-mi visitation rights.
 Kwon Hwa-woon as Kim Yeon-joon (David Kim), a pro golfer based in the U.S. but returns to South Korea to find his first love
 Go Na-hee as Kang Woo-joo, adopted daughter of Kang Ji-min and Eun Se-mi whom Ji-min discovers to be Ji Eun-soo's biological child

Recurring
 Lee Won-jong as Yoon Sang-gyu, Kim Ho-ran's former secretary and right hand man
 Go Soo-hee as Jung Mi-jin, Eun-soo's cellmate who starts a new life after being released
 Kim Seung-hwan as Kang Seung-hwa, Ji-min's father. He and his wife run a restaurant named after their granddaughter.
 Im Ye-jin as Hwang Hyo-soon, Ji-min's mother
 Jung Si-a as Kang Ji-gyung, Ji-min's younger sister
 Kwon Hyuk-hyun as Kim Woong, Kim Ho-ran's secretary

Channel A press office
 Choi Dae-sung as Seo Hyeong-guk, Ji-min's boss
 Yoon Sung-mo as Choi Hyun-bin, an outgoing junior colleague of Kang Ji-min.
 Baek Song-yi as Jung So-ri

Others
 Im Han-bin as Jeon Jin-guk, Mi-jin's son
 Im Seung-dae as Jeon Bong-gu, Mi-jin's husband
 Moon Soo-bin as Chae Ryung
 Kim Tae-yeon as Young Hye

Special appearances
 Nam Myung-ryul as Ji Dong-ri, Eun-soo's father
 Song Jae-hee as Jeon Gi-bum, Eun-soo's abusive ex-husband and biological father of Woo-joo
 Lee Chae-kyung, a prison guard
 Oh Jin-young
 Lee Chae-won

Viewership
A 4.276% viewership rating was recorded nationwide for the series fourth episode, making it the highest rating registered  on Channel A history for a drama. However, its subsequent episodes continue to exceed its own rating record.

Notes

References

External links 
  
 Lie After Lie at Raemongraein 
 
 

Channel A television dramas
Dramax television dramas
2020 South Korean television series debuts
2020 South Korean television series endings
South Korean mystery television series
South Korean suspense television series
South Korean melodrama television series
Television series by RaemongRaein
Wavve original programming